William Shakespeare's Romeo + Juliet: Music from the Motion Picture is the soundtrack to the 1996 film of the same name. The soundtrack contained two separate releases: the first containing popular music from the film and the second containing the score to the film composed by Nellee Hooper, Craig Armstrong and Marius de Vries.

Volume 1
The first soundtrack album to accompany the film was released on the Capitol Records label. It features songs by a number of artists including Garbage, Butthole Surfers and Radiohead (their song "Exit Music (For a Film)", which appears over the end credits, was not included on the soundtrack however, but appeared a year later on Radiohead's album OK Computer).

The soundtrack was a popular and solid seller, reaching No. 2 on the Billboard 200 albums chart and went triple-platinum sales in the U.S. It was especially successful in Australia, where it was the second-highest selling album in 1997, going five times Platinum in sales. A number of hit singles also resulted from the soundtrack, including "Lovefool" by The Cardigans, the love theme "Kissing You" by Des'ree, and a cover of "Young Hearts Run Free" by Kym Mazelle. Quindon Tarver's choral rendition of Rozalla's "Everybody's Free (To Feel Good)" was later used in Luhrmann's "Everybody's Free (To Wear Sunscreen)" single.

The album featured bonus tracks in the 10th Anniversary re-release in 2007.

Track listing

 "Introduction to Romeo", "Kissing You (Love Theme from Romeo + Juliet) Instrumental" and "Young Hearts Run Free (Ballroom Version)" originally appeared on the Volume 2 album.

Volume 2

The soundtrack was later followed by a sequel, William Shakespeare's Romeo + Juliet: Music from the Motion Picture, Volume 2, which featured the film's orchestral score, dialog from the film, and songs not featured on the previous album.

The score to Romeo + Juliet was composed by British music producer Nellee Hooper, Scottish composer Craig Armstrong, and English music composer and producer Marius de Vries. It was arranged, orchestrated, and conducted by Craig Armstrong using the London Session Orchestra and The Metro Voices.

The score fuses bombastic choral sequences produced by The Metro Voices as well as flamboyant orchestral pieces by the London Session Orchestra. It also contains Hooper's favorite trip hop sequences, especially seen in the track "Introduction to Romeo". Some high-beat techno tunes were fused with the chorus and orchestra in the track "Escape from Mantua".

Dialogue from the film was also inserted into several of the tracks. Justin Warfield of One Inch Punch as well the Butthole Surfers and Mundy also contribute vocals to the score. A cover of Prince's "When Doves Cry" by Quindon Tarver features on the album; it became a hit for him in Australia in 1997.

Craig Armstrong's Film Works 1995–2005 solo disc work contained several of these tracks. The score won BAFTA Award for Best Film Music for best film score in 1997. Composer Nellee Hooper was also awarded BAFTA's Anthony Asquith Award for Music for his composition of the score in 1998.

Track listing

Chart positions

Volume 1

Year-end charts

Volume 2

Uses in other media
 Evanescence sampled "Death Scene" and "O Verona" from Volume II in the 2nd and 3rd demo versions of their song "Whisper".
 The X-Files: Fight the Future used "Escape from Mantua" from Volume II in its theatrical trailer.
 British TV talent show The X Factor uses "O Verona" regularly in the pre-title sequences and as the judges' entrance tune
 Wrestler Triple H used "O Verona" as part of his entrance for Wrestlemania 30 when he went up in a losing effort against Daniel Bryan for the chance to be in the Triple Threat Match for the WWE World Heavyweight Championship against Batista and Randy Orton.
 "O Verona" is used in the trailer for 'Quills' starring Geoffrey Rush and Kate Winslet.

Certifications

References

Romance film soundtracks
1996 soundtrack albums
1997 soundtrack albums
1990s film soundtrack albums
Capitol Records soundtracks
Craig Armstrong (composer) soundtracks
Music based on works by William Shakespeare
Crime film soundtracks
Drama film soundtracks